Bixi is a tortoise-like animal in Chinese mythology.

Bixi may also refer to:

Harvard Bixi, a sculpture in 	Cambridge, Massachusetts, United States
PBSC Urban Solutions, a bicycle-sharing system developer and supplier who created the BIXI brand
BIXI Montréal, a bicycle-sharing system in Montréal, Canada
Capital Bixi, Ottawa, Canada

See also
Bixie, a lion-like animal in Chinese mythology